Čifáre is a village and municipality in the Nitra District in western central Slovakia, in the Nitra Region.

History
In historical records the village was first mentioned in 1209.

Geography
The village lies at an altitude of 173 metres and covers an area of 15.339 km2. It has a population of about 644 people.

Ethnicity
The village is approximately 57% Slovak and 43% Hungarian.

Facilities
The village has a football pitch.

Genealogical resources

The records for genealogical research are available at the state archive "Statny Archiv in Nitra, Slovakia"

 Roman Catholic church records (births/marriages/deaths): 1711-1937 (parish A)
 Lutheran church records (births/marriages/deaths): 1845-1898 (parish B)
 Reformated church records (births/marriages/deaths): 1827-1895 (parish B)

See also
 List of municipalities and towns in Slovakia

External links
http://www.statistics.sk/mosmis/eng/run.html
Surnames of living people in Cifare

Villages and municipalities in Nitra District